Miguel Cinches (February 7, 1932 – April 12, 2010) was the Roman Catholic bishop of the Roman Catholic Diocese of Surigao, Philippines.

Ordained to the priesthood on October 22, 1961, Cinches was named bishop on January 10, 1973 and was ordained on March 24, 1973 resigning on April 21, 2001.

Notes

20th-century Roman Catholic bishops in the Philippines
1932 births
2010 deaths